The Holy Trinity Church is a Finnish Orthodox Church located in the Kruununhaka district of Helsinki, on the corner of  Unioninkatu and Rauhankatu. The church was built in the neo-classical style in 1826 under the direction of the architect Carl Ludvig Engel, and was dedicated and opened in the following year.   The Holy Trinity services the city's orthodox community with Divine Liturgy held in both Church Slavic and Finnish.

The church is Helsinki's oldest Orthodox church. When Finland became 1808 autonomic  Grand Duchy of Finland, a number of Russian civil servants, merchants and soldiers moved to Helsinki. They needed a place for worship, and the czar supported their efforts to get a church. In the 21st century, many of the churchgoers still speak Russian, but majority of them are immigrants born in the Soviet Union.

Gallery

See also
 Finnish Orthodox Church
 Uspenski Cathedral

References

External links
 Holy Trinity Church, Helsinki (Homepage). 
 

Carl Ludvig Engel buildings
Churches in Helsinki
Kruununhaka
Churches completed in 1826
19th-century Eastern Orthodox church buildings
1826 establishments in the Russian Empire
Neoclassical church buildings in Finland
Finnish Orthodox churches